Kingman High School could refer to:

 Kingman High School (Kingman, Arizona), formerly Kingman High School North
 Kingman High School Kingman, Kansas
 Kingman High School, a former high school in Peoria, Illinois, previously known as Averyville High School, and replaced by Woodruff High School (Peoria, Illinois) in 1937